Ankh: Heart of Osiris is the second game in the Ankh series of video games. The game was released in Germany on October 30, 2006, released in France on November 17, 2006. and released in the United Kingdom on May 18, 2007. The development team originally announced that the game would be an expansion pack to Ankh, but later confirmed the game was a pseudo-sequel to the first game.

Plot
Assil has just returned to Cairo weeks after he had dispelled Osiris' curse and finds that the holy ankh has vanished. Assil needs to recover the ankh before Osiris can unleash another curse on Egypt.

Gameplay 

The game contains three playable characters: Assil, Thara and the Pharaoh. Gameplay is similar to the Runaway series. The game requires clicking on objects and places in the area to solve puzzles and progress. By default the player will be able to move the playable character around. When the mouse pointer is hovered over a particular something, the icon changes to match a different action such as Looking, Taking, Talking and Using. Items in the inventory can be looked at by left clicking on them and used by right clicking on them.

One puzzle served as a copyright protection measure, in which the player was required to use a code wheel provided with the game copy to solve the combination in order to continue the game.

Development
During the game's development, Deck13 revised the puzzles and content based on feedback from the previous game, while trying to balance the storyline and gameplay as well as the difficulty of the puzzles.

Reception

Domestic

International

See also
Runaway 2: The Dream of the Turtle
The Moment of Silence
Tony Tough 2: A Rake's Progress

References

External links

Official Ankh website (Macromedia Flash required)

2006 video games
Adventure games
Deck13 games
Linux games
MacOS games
RuneSoft games
Video games based on Egyptian mythology
Video games developed in Germany
Video games set in Egypt
Windows games